Dinesh Kumar (born 15 July 1979) is an Indian academic. He is a professor and dean of the School Of Chemical Sciences at the Central University of Gujarat (CUG).

Early life and education 
Kumar obtained his PhD in chemistry from the Department of Chemistry at the University of Rajasthan in 2006.

Career 
He was the editor of Nanocellulose and Its Composites for Water Treatment Applications.

References 

21st-century Indian chemists
University of Rajasthan alumni